ENAC Alumni is a nonprofit organization, alumni association created in 1987, and registered in Toulouse, Midi-Pyrénées. A key founder and former vice president of the association was Robert Aladenyse who dedicated his career to the ENAC alumni. Each year, the Robert Aladenyse Award recognizes the best internships of the year.

The main missions of the association are to bring together the alumni of ENAC, to support the alumni community worldwide, and to contribute to the development of École Nationale de l'Aviation Civile (National University of Civil Aviation also referred to as French Civil Aviation University). ENAC is the first European Graduate School in the fields of aeronautics and aviation. As of January 2023, it has about 27,500 alumni which makes the association the largest in France for aviation programs.

History 
The École Nationale de l'Aviation Civile was founded in 1949 in Orly, France. Its initial purpose was to educate the future public workers of the Directorate General for Civil Aviation. At the beginning of the 1970s, the university started the recruitment of students for the aerospace industry, outside of its original pool of future DGAC employees. The number of so-called "civilian" students steadily grew in the 1980s. Robert Aladenyse (1931-2003, 1964 graduate) decided in 1987 to create a nonprofit organization for the aviation engineers (Diplôme d'ingénieur) alumni. This association was then called IngENAC.

In the 2000s, the development of the Master's degree and Mastères Spécialisés programs led IngENAC to expand its membership to these new alumnus. On January 1, 2010, ENAC merged with the SEFA (flight school) and became the largest aeronautical university in Europe. These major changes in the profile of ENAC and its alumni population were an impetus for a deeper redevelopment of IngENAC into a broader alumni association reflecting the new ambitions of the university and the diversity of its community. In 2012, IngENAC changed name and became known as ENAC Alumni. The newly rebranded association is now the alumni association of all graduates of ENAC, whatever their degree. This includes the Aeronautical operations technicians, the Techniciens supérieur de l'aviation, the Air Traffic Safety Electronics Personnels and the Ingénieurs des études et de l'exploitation de l'aviation civile. The new status became effective in March 2012.

In February 2019, ENAC Alumni held the first edition of The State of the Air (Les Etats de l'Air) which is a conference featuring a series of round tables and master classes with a panel of aviation leaders. The 2019 edition was hosted by the French DGAC.

Missions 

The actions and policies of ENAC Alumni intend to achieve the following goals:
 
 To create and maintain friendship among all alumni of the Ecole Nationale de l'Aviation Civile;
 To promote the personal and professional development of the members;
 To contribute to the development of aeronautics and air transportation worldwide;
 To provide continuing education in aviation and space;
 To defend the ENAC degrees and promote them abroad;
 To promote the brand and programs of ENAC;
 To support ENAC in its missions;
 To serve the alumni community and provide support and assistance to members in need.

In order to achieve these missions, ENAC Alumni participates in celebrations such as ENAC's graduation ceremonies, provides speakers to ENAC, creates local chapters and think tanks, contributes to the promotion of aviation careers, and holds events such as The State of the Air (Les Etats de l'Air). ENAC Alumni is responsible for maintaining the registry of the alumni of ENAC.

ENAC Alumni is a member of the Conférence des Grandes Écoles that represents the colleges of engineering in France.

National and regional chapters
 ENAC Alumni has several chapters around the world that bring together alumni and students and serve these communities with local actions and programs. These chapters are groups within the association. As of December 2021, the international network counted 40 chapters. In October 2022, ENAC Alumni's network of chapters and liaisons achieved global coverage with 51 chapters.

ENAC Alumni USA
The U.S. chapter of ENAC Alumni was founded in December 2018. It has over 100 members across the United States. Its programs include developing the membership, mentoring students and young professionals, promoting diversity and inclusion, and strengthening the relationship with U.S. universities. It has ongoing task forces on the U.S. licenses & certifications and professional organizations. The chapter has also an emergency information and mutual aid coordination initiative that was launched in response to Hurricane Dorian and was activated again during the COVID-19 crisis.

Aviation think tanks
ENAC Alumni has professional think tanks conducting research projects and holding round tables aiming to advancing aviation and space in various domains:
 Aircraft & System Think Tank
 Airline Operations Think Tank
 Airport Think Tank
 ATM Think Tank
 Contractors Think Tank
 Digital Innovation Think Tank
 Legal Affairs Think Tank
 Maintenance (MRO) Think Tank
 Pilots Think Tank
 Safety & Compliance Think Tank
 Space Think Tank
 Sustainable Development Think Tank

Airport Think Tank
The Airport Think Tank is chaired by Gaël Le Bris. With over 100 members, it is one of the largest think tanks of ENAC Alumni. This think tank is conducting The Future of Airports: A Vision of 2040 and 2070, a research initiative on the long-term future of the airport industry. This project involves a global industry panel of about 20 thought aviation leaders worldwide as well as regional task forces. The first version of the global analysis was released in April 2020. The think tank has also released a guidance on COVID-19.

Industrial and institutional partners 
According to the website of ENAC Alumni, the key partners of the association are the following:

 Airbus Group
 Airexpo
 Akka Technologies
 Conférence des grandes écoles
 Elles Bougent
 ENAC
 ENVOL JE
 France Aviation Civile Services
 Ingénieurs et scientifiques de France
 Luxair
 TBS Alumni

Also, ENAC Alumni supports various student initiatives such as the annual air show Airexpo organized jointly with the Institut Supérieur de l'Aéronautique et de l'Espace community. 
The association is a partner of the Aeronautical literary festival.

Organization
ENAC Alumni is administered by volunteers, working in close collaboration with the university administration and third party organizations. 20 members of the Board of Administrators are elected by the contributing members of the association. The results are proclaimed every year during the annual general assembly of the association. Members of the Board have 2-year mandates, and half of the seats are on the ballot every year. During the general assembly, the new Board of Administrators appoints the Executive Board.

Additionally, the association has project/program managers, as well as chairs and vice chairs for the chapters and think tanks. Estelle Tréville is the Communications and Network Manager of ENAC Alumni as a full-time employee.

Board of Administrators
 Marc Houalla, President since March 2018
 Faude Adanhounsounou, Vice President
 Elena Djakovitch, Vice President
 Gaël Le Bris, Vice President
 Paul Leparoux, Treasurer
 Arnaud Francq, Deputy Treasurer
 Julie Cabanel, Secretary
 Damien Gaudin, Deputy Secretary
 Glawdys Flora Akete Oyono, Member of the Board
 Eva Carillet, Member of the Board
 Anne Cotel-Ballot, Member of the Board
 Philippe Fonta, Member of the Board
 Adrien Martin, Member of the Board
 Isabelle Monnier, Member of the Board
 Loup-Giang Nguyen, Member of the Board
 Léa Pineau, Member of the Board
 Jean Marc de Raffin Dourny, Member of the Board
 Antoine Roehri, Member of the Board
 Christelle Schoeffel, Member of the Board
 Nabil Tahiri, Member of the Board

The President and Vice Presidents, as well as the Treasurer, Secretary, and their deputies are the Executive Board of ENAC Alumni.

Publications and communications
The think tanks of the association have produced strategic and technical white papers on various topics including airport resiliency in the era of COVID-19 and the 11-paper series The Future of Airports: A Vision of 2040 and 2070.

ENAC Alumni has published ENAC Alumni Magazine since 2014. This publication is the successor of the Transpondeur of IngENAC. The association is also active on social media and especially on Facebook, Twitter, and LinkedIn.

See also 
 Direction générale de l'aviation civile
 École nationale de l'aviation civile

References

External links
 Official website

Alumni associations
Organizations based in Toulouse
École nationale de l'aviation civile
1987 establishments in France